Nautley River (Dakelh: Nadlehkoh - ″Where the salmon return creek″ or Nadleh - ″(fish) run″) drains Fraser Lake into the Nechako River in the Central Interior of British Columbia, Canada.

There is a long-standing feud between proponents of Powell River and those of the Nautley River over which body is the shortest.
The river is entirely on the Nadleh Whut'en First Nation reserve.

References

Nechako Country
Rivers of British Columbia